The Clark County Library is located at 609 Caddo St. in Arkadelphia, Arkansas.  It is located in a Classical Revival single-story brick building designed by Charles L. Thompson, a noted Little Rock architect, and built in 1903.  It is one of the oldest institutional library buildings in Arkansas.  It was built by the local Women's Library Association, and transferred to county control in 1974.

The building was listed on the U.S. National Register of Historic Places in 1974.

See also
National Register of Historic Places listings in Clark County, Arkansas

References

External links
Clark County Library web site

Library buildings completed in 1903
Libraries on the National Register of Historic Places in Arkansas
Buildings and structures in Arkadelphia, Arkansas
National Register of Historic Places in Clark County, Arkansas
1903 establishments in Arkansas